Haplochromis obtusidens is a species of cichlid endemic to Lake Victoria.  This species can reach a length of  SL.

References

obtusidens
Fish described in 1928
Taxonomy articles created by Polbot